The Moreton Frewen House, at 506 E. 23rd St. in  Cheyenne, Wyoming, also known as the Everett V. Hall House, was built in 1881.  It was listed on the National Register of Historic Places in 1975.

It is significant for its association with stockman Moreton Frewen, and also as a well-preserved historic house.

References

Houses on the National Register of Historic Places in Wyoming
Houses completed in 1881
Laramie County, Wyoming